Parliamentary elections were held in the Republic of Serbia on 23 December 2000. They were the first free parliamentary elections after the overthrow of Slobodan Milošević. The result was a victory for the Democratic Opposition of Serbia, which won 176 of the 250 seats in the National Assembly.

Electoral lists 
Following electoral lists took part in the 2000 parliamentary election:

Results

References

Overthrow of Slobodan Milošević
Elections in Serbia
Elections in Serbia and Montenegro
Serbia
Serbia
Parliamentary